Lowndes County is in the central part of the U.S. state of Alabama. As of the 2020 census, the county's  population was 10,311. Its county seat is Hayneville. The county is named in honor of William Lowndes, a member of the United States Congress from South Carolina.

Lowndes County is part of the Montgomery, Alabama Metropolitan Statistical Area. Historically it has been considered part of the Black Belt, known for its fertile soil, cotton plantations, and high number of African American workers,  enslaved and later freed.

History
Lowndes County was formed from Montgomery, Dallas and Butler counties, by an act of the Alabama General Assembly on January 20, 1830. The county is named for South Carolina statesman William Lowndes. It is part of the Black Belt, where cotton plantations were developed in the antebellum years and agriculture continued as a dominant part of the economy into the 20th century.

During the Reconstruction era, blacks were elected to local and state offices. White Democrats regained power and control of the state legislature in 1874 and drove the remaining office holders out. They adopted the 1875 Constitution of Alabama and another in  1901 that disenfranchised most blacks and many poor whites. Requirements were added for payment of a cumulative poll tax before registering to vote, difficult for poor people to manage who often had no cash on hand; and literacy tests (with a provision for a grandfather clause to exempt illiterate white voters from being excluded.) The number of black voters on the rolls fell dramatically in the next few years, as did the number of poor white voters.

From the end of the 19th through the early decades of the 20th centuries, organized white violence increased against blacks, with 16 lynchings recorded in the county, the fourth-highest total in the state, which historically is among those in the South with the highest rate of per capita lynchings. Most victims were black men, subjected to white extra-legal efforts to maintain white supremacy by racial terrorism. Seven of these murders were committed in Letohatchee, an unincorporated community south of Montgomery; five in 1900 and two in 1917. In 1900 mobs killed a black man accused of killing a white man. When local black resident Jim Cross objected, he was killed, too, at his house, followed by his wife, son and daughter. In 1917 two black brothers were killed by a white mob for alleged "insolence" to a white farmer on the road. On July 31, 2016, a historical marker was erected at Letohatchee by the Equal Justice Initiative in coordination with the city to commemorate the people who had suffered these extrajudicial executions.

Because of the shift in agriculture and the Great Migration of blacks to leave oppressive conditions, population in the rural county has declined by two thirds since the 1900 high of more than 35,000. The effects of farm mechanization and the boll weevil infestation, which decimated the cotton crops and reduced the need for farm labor in the 1920s and 1930s, caused widespread loss of jobs.

Civil Rights Era
By 1960 (as shown on census tables below), the population had declined to about 15,000 residents and was about 80 percent-majority black. The rural county was referred to as "Bloody Lowndes", the rusty buckle of Alabama's Black Belt, because of the high rate of white violence against blacks to maintain segregation. In 1965, a century after the American Civil War and decades after whites had disenfranchised blacks via the 1901 state constitution, they maintained white supremacy by intimidation and violence, suppressing black voting.

County population had fallen by more than half from its 1900 high, as both blacks and whites moved to urban areas. Blacks still outnumbered whites by a 4-to-1 ratio. Eighty-six white families owned 90 percent of the land in the county and controlled the government, as whites had since 1901. With an economy based on agriculture, black residents worked mostly in low-level rural jobs. In the civil rights era, not one black resident was registered to vote before March 1, 1965.

The passage of the Civil Rights Act of 1964 and the Voting Rights Act of 1965 in August of that year encouraged civil rights leaders to believe they could fight racism in Lowndes. The Lowndes County Freedom Organization (LCFO) was founded in the county as a new, independent political party designed to help blacks stand up to intimidation and murder.

Organized by the young civil rights leader Stokely Carmichael of the Student Nonviolent Coordinating Committee (SNCC), in the summer of 1965 Lowndes residents launched an intensive effort to register blacks in the county to vote. SNCC's plan was simple: to get enough black people to vote so blacks might be fully represented in the local government and redirect services to black residents, 80 percent of whom lived below the poverty line. Carmichael and others organized registration drives, demonstrations, and political education classes in support of the black residents. The Voting Rights Act authorized the federal government to oversee voter registration and voting processes in places such as Lowndes County where substantial minorities were historically under-represented.

The police continued to arrest protesters in the summer of 1965. A group of protesters were released from jail in the county seat of Hayneville on August 20, 1965. As four of them approached a small store, Thomas Coleman, an unpaid special deputy, ordered them away. When he aimed his shotgun at one of the young black women (Ruby Sales) Jonathan Myrick Daniels pushed her down, taking the blast, which immediately killed the Episcopal seminarian. Coleman also shot Father Richard Morrisroe, a Catholic priest, in the back, then stopped. He was indicted for the murder of Daniels; and an all-white jury quickly acquitted him after his claim of self-defense, although both men were unarmed. Coleman had been appointed as special deputy by the county sheriff.

In 1966 after working to register African-American voters, the Lowndes County Freedom Organization (LCFO), the first independent black political party in the county since Reconstruction, recruited several local residents as candidates for county offices. It adopted the emblem of the black panther, in contrast to the white rooster of the white-dominated Alabama Democratic Party. On May 3, 1966, over 900 registered black voters cast their ballots at the county seat in Hayneville as independent participants in the primary, with some driving over 25 miles to do so. One notable strategy the LCFO encouraged among black voters was to help other black voters if they needed assistance as a precaution against the fact that "the Lowndes County Freedom Organization knew that once a local white person got behind the curtain with a black person, that vote would be lost" (p. 111). Another was to encourage black voters to simply pull the lever to vote strictly for LCFO candidates; in other words, to "pull the lever for the Black Panther and go on home," as stated on a sign on Highway U.S. 80 between Montgomery and Selma.

Whites in Lowndes County reacted strongly against the LCFO. In retaliation for black sharecroppers engaging in civil rights work, white landowners evicted many of them from their rental houses and land plots. They used economic blackmail to make them both homeless and unemployed in a struggling economy. The SNCC and Lowndes County leaders worked to help these families stay together and remain in the county. They bought tents, cots, heaters, food, and water and helped several families build a temporary "tent city". Despite harassment, including shots regularly fired into the encampment, these black residents persevered for nearly two years as organizers helped them find new jobs and look for permanent housing.

Whites refused to serve known LCFO members in stores and restaurants. Several small riots broke out over the issue. The LCFO pushed forward and continued to organize and register voters.  However, none of their candidates won in the November 1966 general election. In a December 1966 edition of The Liberator, a Black Power magazine, activist Gwendolyn Patton alleged the election had been subverted by widespread ballot fraud. But historians believe that black sharecroppers refrained from voting, submitting to the severe pressure put on them by the local white plantation owners, who employed most of them. After the LCFO folded into the statewide Democratic Party in 1970, African Americans have supported candidates who have won election to local offices. In a continuing divide, since the late 20th century, most white conservative voters in Alabama have shifted to the Republican Party.

In White v. Crook (1966), Federal District Judge Frank M. Johnson ruled in a class action suit brought on behalf of black residents of Lowndes County, who demonstrated they had been excluded from juries. Women of all races were excluded from juries by state statute. Johnson ordered that the state of Alabama must take action to recruit both male and female blacks to serve on juries, as well as other women, according to their rights under the Fourteenth Amendment. The suit was joined by other class members from other counties who dealt with similar conditions of exclusion from juries. It was "one of the first civil actions brought to remedy systematic exclusion of Negroes from jury service generally."

The LCFO continued to fight for wider political participation. Their goal of democratic, community control of politics spread into the wider civil rights movement. The first black sheriff in the county to be elected since Reconstruction was John Hullett, elected in 1970.

Today an Interpretive Center in the county, maintained by the National Park Service, memorializes the Tent City and LCFO efforts in political organizing.

Geography
The county is located in the Gulf Coastal Plain region of the state.

Major highways
  Interstate 65
  U.S. Highway 31
  U.S. Highway 80
  State Route 21
  State Route 97
  State Route 185
  State Route 263

Adjacent counties
 Autauga County (north)
 Montgomery County (east)
 Crenshaw County (southeast)
 Butler County (south)
 Wilcox County (southwest)
 Dallas County (west)

National protected area
 Selma to Montgomery National Historic Trail (part)

Demographics

2020 census

As of the 2020 United States census, there were 10,311 people, 4,251 households, and 2,741 families residing in the county.

2010 census
As of the 2010 United States census, there were 11,299 people living in the county. In terms of ethnicity, 73.5% identified as Black or African American, 25.3% White, 0.2% Native American, 0.1% Asian, 0.3% of some other race and 0.5% of two or more races. 0.8% were Hispanic or Latino (of any race).

2000 census
As of the census of 2000, there were 13,473 people, 4,909 households, and 3,588 families living in the county.  The population density was 19 people per square mile (7/km2).  There were 5,801 housing units at an average density of 8 per square mile (3/km2).  The racial makeup of the county was 73.37% Black or African American, 25.86% White,  0.11% Native American, 0.12% Asian, 0.02% Pacific Islander, 0.12% from other races, and 0.40% from two or more races.  0.63% of the population were Hispanic or Latino of any race.

According to the census of 2000, the largest ancestry groups claimed by residents in Lowndes County were African American 73.37%, English 20.14%, and Scots-Irish 3.1%.

There were 4,909 households, out of which 35.40% had children under the age of 18 living with them, 42.90% were married couples living together, 25.70% had a female householder with no husband present, and 26.90% were non-families. 24.60% of all households were made up of individuals, and 9.40% had someone living alone who was 65 years of age or older.  The average household size was 2.73 and the average family size was 3.28.

In the county, the population was spread out, with 30.20% under the age of 18, 9.10% from 18 to 24, 27.10% from 25 to 44, 21.40% from 45 to 64, and 12.20% who were 65 years of age or older.  The median age was 34 years. For every 100 females, there were 87.90 males.  For every 100 females age 18 and over, there were 82.90 males.

The median income for a household in the county was $23,050, and the median income for a family was $28,935. Males had a median income of $27,694 versus $20,137 for females. The per capita income for the county was $12,457. About 26.60% of families and 31.40% of the population were below the poverty line, including 41.70% of those under age 18 and 26.60% of those age 65 or over.

Government
Like all of the Black Belt, Lowndes County is powerfully Democratic. The only Republican to carry the county since 1900 was Barry Goldwater in 1964. In that year, most of the county's black majority was still prevented from voting. Opposition by the voting white minority to civil rights had resulted in the national Democratic candidate, Lyndon Johnson, being excluded from the ballot in the state.

Even after congressional passage of the Voting Rights Act of 1965, black registration was so slow that segregationist George Wallace comfortably carried the county in 1968. Since then, the Democratic presidential candidate has carried Lowndes in every election. In 1972, Lowndes was one of six former Wallace counties to vote for George McGovern in 1972 against Richard Nixon's 3,000-plus-county landslide.

As of 2014, Lowndes County has a five-member county commission, elected from single-member districts. The county sheriff is elected as well.

Education
Lowndes County is served by Lowndes County Public Schools, which include:
 Calhoun High School
 Central Elementary School
 Central High School
 Fort Deposit Elementary School
 Hayneville Middle School
 Jackson-Steele Elementary School
 Lowndes County Middle School

Health
A study published in the American Journal of Tropical Medicine and Hygiene in 2017 collected samples from 55 people in Lowndes County and found that 19 (34.5%) of studied samples tested positive for hookworm. The study concluded that the parasite burden was low. Hookworm infection is a soil-transmitted helminthiasis and classified as a neglected tropical disease associated with extreme poverty.

As of 2013, 23.5% of residents had diagnosed diabetes, the highest percentage of any county in the United States.

Communities

Towns
 Benton
 Fort Deposit
 Gordonville
 Hayneville (county seat)
 Lowndesboro
 Mosses
 White Hall

Unincorporated communities
 Braggs
 Burkville
 Calhoun
 Collirene
 Letohatchee
 Mount Willing
 Sandy Ridge
 Trickem

See also
 National Register of Historic Places listings in Lowndes County, Alabama
 Properties on the Alabama Register of Landmarks and Heritage in Lowndes County, Alabama
 Fort Deposit–Lowndes County Airport
 Battle of Holy Ground
 Calhoun Colored School
 Bates Turkey Farm

References

Notes

Further reading

External links
 Welcome To Lowndes County, Alabama

 
1830 establishments in Alabama
Populated places established in 1830
Black Belt (U.S. region)
Montgomery metropolitan area
Majority-minority counties in Alabama